Elena Guerra (born 20 January 1976) is a Uruguayan middle-distance runner. She competed in the women's 1500 metres at the 2004 Summer Olympics.

References

1976 births
Living people
Athletes (track and field) at the 2004 Summer Olympics
Uruguayan female middle-distance runners
Olympic athletes of Uruguay
Place of birth missing (living people)
Uruguayan female cross country runners
Uruguayan female long-distance runners